Crystal Tower is a class A office building located on the Lancu de Hunedoara Boulevard in Bucharest, Romania. The Crystal Tower was the first private office building in Bucharest that was built with a heliport, and it serves as the headquarters of the Dutch banking group ING.

External links

Skyscraper office buildings in Bucharest

Office buildings completed in 2011